Centropolis Entertainment is a German-American film production company founded in 1985 as Centropolis Film Productions by German film director Roland Emmerich and American film producer Dean Devlin.
As of 2001, the company is a subsidiary of Das Werk AG.

History 
In 1996, Emmerich launched his special effects studio Centropolis Effects to provide VFX effects for its motion pictures. It was shut down in 2001.

In 1997, the studio launched its television division Centropolis Television. Its first production was The Visitor, a show that was aired on Fox.

In 1998, Centropolis stuck a deal with Sony Pictures Entertainment to produce motion pictures for its studio.

Dean Devlin, however ultimately left in 2001 in order to form Electric Entertainment. Electric has inherited and finished development on the films he's developing, including Eight Legged Freaks.

Filmography

Films

TV Series

References

External links
 Centropolis Entertainment website

Film production companies of the United States
Entertainment companies based in California
Companies based in Culver City, California
Entertainment companies established in 1985
1985 establishments in California
Roland Emmerich